Livistona speciosa is a species of fan palm in the family Arecaceae.

Description and distribution
It is a tall palm that can reach 25 m in length and a diameter of 30 cm. It has large fan-shaped leaves.

Livistona speciosa is native from Southern China to Vietnam, Thailand, Myanmar, Bangladesh, Peninsular Malaysia and Singapore.
In Thailand it is known as kho, being a name that it shares with the Ceylon oak.

References

speciosa
Trees of China
Trees of Indo-China
Trees of Bangladesh
Trees of Malaya